The word maiale (plural maiali) is:
Italian for "pig"
An Italian word for a manned torpedo
 Nicholas Maiale, a former Democratic member of the Pennsylvania House of Representatives and a native of Philadelphia